Edward Martin Dahl (3 August 1886, in Bromma – 21 November 1961) was a Swedish athlete.  He competed in the 1906 Intercalated Games in Athens and in the 1908 Summer Olympics in London.

At the Intercalated Games in 1906 he won the bronze medal in the 5 miles competition. He also participated in the 1500 metres event.

In 1908 Dahl placed second in his semifinal heat of the 1500 metres with a time of 4:10.4, not advancing to the final.

In the 800 metres, Dahl did not finish his semifinal heat and did not advance to the final.

References

Sources
 
 
 

1886 births
1961 deaths
Athletes from Stockholm
Swedish male long-distance runners
Olympic athletes of Sweden
Medalists at the 1906 Intercalated Games
Athletes (track and field) at the 1906 Intercalated Games
Athletes (track and field) at the 1908 Summer Olympics
World record setters in athletics (track and field)